The dancesport competitions at the 2005 World Games in Duisburg was held between 16 and 17 July. 134 dancers from 36 nations, participated in the tournament. The dancesport competition took place at König Pilsener Arena in Oberhausen near Duisburg.

Participating nations

Medal table

Events

References

External links
 World DanceSport Federation
 Dancesport on IWGA website
 Results

 
2005 World Games
2005